Andrew Jay Kleinfeld (born June 12, 1945) is an American lawyer and jurist serving as a senior U.S. circuit judge of the U.S. Court of Appeals for the Ninth Circuit since 2010. He served as an active judge on the Ninth Circuit from 1991 to 2010. Kleinfeld was previously a U.S. district judge on the U.S. District Court for the District of Alaska from 1986 to 1991.

Early life, education, and legal career

Kleinfeld graduated from Wesleyan University in 1966 with a Bachelor of Arts. He then attended Harvard Law School, graduating in 1969 with a Juris Doctor. 

After graduating from law school, Kleinfeld was a law clerk to justice Jay Rabinowitz of the Alaska Supreme Court from 1969 to 1971. He then entered private practice in Fairbanks, also serving for several years as a part-time U.S. magistrate judge for Alaska's U.S. District Court.

Kleinfeld is married to Judith (Smilg) Kleinfeld, a professor at the University of Alaska Fairbanks. Kleinfeld's family is Jewish.

Federal judicial service
Kleinfeld was nominated to a seat on the United States District Court for the District of Alaska by President Ronald Reagan on March 26, 1986, confirmed by the United States Senate on May 14, 1986, and received his commission on May 15, 1986. His service terminated on October 7, 1991, due to elevation to the Ninth Circuit.

On May 23, 1991, President George H. W. Bush nominated Kleinfeld to a seat on the United States Court of Appeals for the Ninth Circuit, vacated by Judge Alfred T. Goodwin. He was confirmed by the Senate on September 12, 1991, and received his commission on September 16, 1991. He assumed senior status on June 12, 2010.

Notable cases

Involvement in Wal-Mart discrimination case

In 2007, a Ninth Circuit panel affirmed the class action certification in Dukes v. Wal-Mart Stores, Inc., a lawsuit initiated by female employees of Wal-Mart against the company for gender discrimination. Kleinfeld wrote a sharply worded dissent, saying "this case poses a considerable risk of enriching undeserving class members and counsel, but depriving thousands of women actually injured by sex discrimination of their just due."

Free speech

Kleinfeld was the author of the unanimous panel decision of Morse v. Frederick, holding that a student who put up a banner supposedly supporting drug legalization was exercising his freedom of speech protected by the First Amendment, and the school principal acted unconstitutionally in suspending him. The school board appealed the decision to the Supreme Court, which heard the case on March 19, 2007.

The Supreme Court, in a 2007 majority opinion authored by Chief Justice John Roberts, reversed Kleinfeld's ruling and ruled that the First Amendment does not protect in-school student speech advocating illegal drug use.  One key point of disagreement between Judge Kleinfeld's opinion and Chief Justice Roberts' was whether the speech was at or during school. As the banner was displayed across the street from the school (which had been let out for the day), Judge Kleinfeld's panel held that it was an "out of school" activity. Chief Justice Roberts' majority disagreed.

References

External links

Editorial co-authored by Andrew and Judith Kleinfeld

1945 births
20th-century American Jews
20th-century American judges
21st-century American Jews
21st-century American judges
Harvard Law School alumni
Judges of the United States Court of Appeals for the Ninth Circuit
Judges of the United States District Court for the District of Alaska
Living people
Lawyers from Fairbanks, Alaska
Lawyers from New York City
United States court of appeals judges appointed by George H. W. Bush
United States district court judges appointed by Ronald Reagan
Wesleyan University alumni
United States magistrate judges